Dalalun (also Romanized as Dalālūn; also known as Dalālan, Delālān, and Delālon) is a village in Tiab Rural District, in the Central District of Minab County, Hormozgan Province, Iran. At the 2006 census, its population was 99, in 21 families.

References 

Populated places in Minab County